Kim Song-hui (born 24 February 1965) is a North Korean speed skater. He competed at the 1984 Winter Olympics.

References

North Korean male speed skaters
1965 births
Living people
Olympic speed skaters of North Korea
Speed skaters at the 1984 Winter Olympics